Al Mawakeb Schools is an international school system in Dubai, United Arab Emirates. Serving grades Kindergarten through 12, it is managed by Academia Management Solutions International (AMSI). Its high school program uses a U.S. curriculum.

As of 2017 the school system has a total of 10,000 students. The school system itself began in 1979.

Campuses
It has three campuses: Al Mawakeb School - Al Garhoud, which opened in 1979;, Al Mawakeb School - Al Barsha, which opened in 1997 and serves 2,500 students, and Al Mawakeb School - Al Khawaneej which opened in 2018.

Notable alumni
 Dina Shihabi - Saudi actress

References

External links

 Al Mawakeb School
 Al Mawakeb School 

International schools in Dubai
American international schools in the United Arab Emirates
Private schools in the United Arab Emirates
1979 establishments in the United Arab Emirates